Gonzalo de Salazar (Granada, Castile – , New Spain) was an aristocrat, and leader of several councils that governed New Spain while Hernán Cortés was traveling to Honduras, in 1525−26.

Early life 
Though born into a family which was originally Jewish, Gonzalo was the first child baptized to the Christian faith in Granada after its reconquest from the Moors. Consequently, he was granted titles, special privileges, and at an early age, appointed royal page to the Catholic Monarchs at court in Granada, despite his otherwise New Christian pedigree. He fought in the Castilian War of the Communities, opposing the rebels against Emperor Charles V. For this, Charles rewarded him with the position of factor (tax collector), and Captain General (see below) of New Spain from 29 December 1524, until 29 January 1526. 

Prior to the appointment of a Viceroy in New Spain, Gonzalo had worked, alongside Pedro Almíndez Chirino, Alonso de Estrada (who preceded him, and succeeded him—they were on bad terms), and others, and endured power struggles and controversy. Gonzalo's father, Doctor Guadalupe de Salazar, a Sephardic Jewish converso to Catholicism, was royal physician, to the Catholic monarchs, and one of 16 "regidores" (administrators) of Granada during the struggle to oust the Moors. 

Gonzalo, his wife Catalina, and her brother Antonio de La Cadena Maluenda (treasurer of New Spain), left Spain in 1524, and arrived in Mexico City in 1525. A powerful member of the ruling class in the New World, Gonzalo, became an encomendero (holder of an encomienda) of Tajimaroa (Michoacán), and held lands, and titles elsewhere. 

His daughter Catalina de Salazar de la Cadena first married Ruy de Mendoza, of the famous Mendoza clan, and subsequently wed Cristóbal de Oñate. Their son, Juan de Oñate, established San Juan de Los Caballeros near present-day Santa Fe, New Mexico in 1598. Gonzalo's son Juan Velázquez de Salazar, inherited his estates. Gonzalo had a brother named Juan Salazar Velázquez. Gonzalo Salazar's wife, Catarina (aka Catalina) de la Cadena Maluenda, was descended from Mossen Truchas de Calatayud* (*Reference: "El Libro Verde de Aragón"). Originally also a Jewish family surnamed Ha-Levi, they assumed the surname Maluenda after the town where they lived. They had been money lenders to kings, and prominent spice and silk merchants in Europe for hundreds of years. Pedro de Maluenda was commissary for Hernán Cortés; witnessed the destruction of the Aztec Empire, but died of a fever 6 months after the conquest. 

The Spanish colonial families were inter-related, of Christian, Sephardic (converso), or Jewish descent. The title "Captain General" precedes the appointment of "Viceroys" by the Spanish kings in the new world.

Temporary government in the absence of Cortés 
In 1524 Governor and Captain General Cortés left Mexico City for Honduras. He put the government in charge of Alonso de Estrada, royal treasurer of the colony appointed by Charles, Rodrigo de Albornoz and Licenciado Alonso de Zuazo, with Estrada at the head. The transfer of power occurred October 12, 1524.

When Cortés left Mexico City he was accompanied by Gonzalo de Salazar and Pedro Almíndez Chirino as far as Coatzacoalcos. Salazar and Almíndez used this opportunity to convince the conqueror that they should be included in the government. Cortés sent them back with two decrees. The first decree directed that they join the already-formed government of Estrada, Albornoz and Zuazo as its fourth and fifth members, provided that the two groups could reconcile their differences. The second decree directed that Salazar and Almíndez replace Estrada and Albornoz.

Government of Salazar and Almíndez 
When Salazar and Almíndez arrived back in the capital, they suppressed the first of these decrees, and made known only the second one, thus taking over the government. This took place on December 29, 1524. However, they made the mistake of admitting the deception to some friends. This resulted in a scandal, and on February 17, 1525, Estrada and Albornoz were admitted to the government, which now included all five men mentioned by Cortés. In order of importance, these were Salazar (tax collector), Almíndez (inspector), Estrada (treasurer), Albornoz (accountant) and Zuazo (justicia mayor).

The expanded governing council was the work of Zuazo, acting as an arbitrator based on the first decree received from Cortés. The two factions, however, were not really reconciled. Estrada and Albornoz objected to the arrangement. On April 20, 1525, Salazar and Almíndez proclaimed that no officials were to recognize the authority of Estrada and Albornoz, on pain of 100 lashes and confiscation of property. This proclamation was signed by Zuazo, Cervantes, de la Torre, Sotomayor, Rodrigo de Paz (a member of the ayuntamiento, or city government), and the clerk Pérez. Estrada and Albornoz left Mexico City to seek out Cortés and present their case to him.

Despotism 
The council continued with three members (Zuazo was still a member) until April 20, 1525. In the middle of the night, Zuazo was arrested in his home and taken under guard to be sent back to Spain. He went as far as Santo Domingo, where he spent the rest of his life, and died in 1527.

Zuazo was a respectable, educated man, a friend of Cortés, and apparently incorruptible. His arrest freed Salazar and Almíndez from all checks on their authority, and they began to govern despotically. They made it known that Cortés (untruthfully) had been killed by Indians. On August 19, 1525 they tried to confiscate his property. They arrested Rodrigo de Paz, whom Cortés had left as majordomo of his property. Paz was tortured to find out the location of Cortés's hidden treasure. He provided some locations, and then was hanged in the plaza.

Salazar sent out agents to extort treasures. When refugees were forced to leave a church, Father Valencia protested the violation of sanctuary by excommunicating Mexico City until the prisoners were restored.

Overthrow 
In January 1526 a messenger (Martín de Orantes AKA Dorantes) announced the return of Cortés in Mexico City. Cortes issued a decree replacing Salazar and Almíndez in the governing triumvirate with, Francisco de las Casas, and Pedro de Alvarado. In the absence, or incapacity of Las Casas and Alvarado, Estrada and Albornoz were named as replacements. Salazar and Almindez sought refuge in the Franciscan convent. Polorized, Salazar proponents assembled before Cortes arrived. They consisted of clergymen, friends, servants, family, and some followers, alongside those who wanted to reinstate Estrada. Orantes entered the city in secret and made contact with members of the opposition.

At daybreak on January 28, 1526 two hundred Spaniards rushed the convent. Armed supporters of Salazar, were intent on murdering Estrada, and were ready for a fight. Sadly, Salazar confronted the group alongside other noblemen, and relented. Cortes supporters had succeeded in getting the ayuntamiento to execute the orders of Cortes. The former opposition group left the convent and marched along the streets shouting "Viva Cortés".  They then assembled to the left of the convent. Salazar was arrested and caged in public display in the Zocalo, that same day. Almindez was also arrested in Tlaxcala and brought back to the city. With De Las Casas and Alvarado absent, Estrada and Albornoz governed from January 29, 1526 to June 24, of that same year, or just short of six months. Thereafter, Cortes returned briefly to his post on June 25, Salazar and Almindez did not. Salazar was freed after a few months, exiled to Spain, and banned from returning to New Spain.

Afterwards 
Salazar and Almíndez escaped the fate of many of their enemies because of their royal connections. Salazar escaped execution due to his status. In June a new administration was formed.

Despite the court intrigue, and plots, Salazar returned to the Spanish court, was reappointed, and returned to New Spain in 1540. He completed his position as factor in New Spain without issue. Salazar behaved as if nothing had happened. Dubbed "el gordo" behind his back, he was overly courteous and courtly. A sinister persona, he left politics thereafter, and lived comfortably until his death probably in 1564.

See also 
 List of Viceroys of New Spain

References 

 Allmand, Christopher and McKitterick, Rosamond, "The New Cambridge Medieval History, c. 1415-1500," Vol. 7, p. 155, published 1998.
Barredo de Valenzuela y Arrojo, Adolfo, and De Cadenas y Lopez, Ampelio Alonso, "Nobiliario de Extremadura, Tomo III, Madrid, 1998, pps. 55-62, & (Dukes of Feria) p. 263.
Baer, Y. "A History of the Jews of Christian Spain." Philadelphia 1962.
 Cantera Burgos, F. "Alvar Garcia de Santa Maria." Madrid, 1952. The HaLevi-Maluenda-De La Cadena lineage is associated with Bishop Pablo Santa Maria of Burgos. Former Rabbi of Spain, he was born Selomoth HaLevi. He, his sister Ana Maria [later surnamed Nunez-Maluenda], brothers Pedro Suarez and Alvar Garcia [de Santa Maria], his 3 sons and 1 daughter, ages 3–12, converted July 21, 1390 or 1391 in Burgos Cathedral. Recent studies indicate they may have converted after the riots and pogroms in Burgos, rather than before. [See Poliakov, Leon The History of Anti-Semitism, Volume 2, pages 160–1 University of Pennsylvania Press: 2003.] Pablo's wife Juana remained a Jew, but was buried in a church built by Pablo Santa Maria. The HaLevis claimed to be from the same tribe as the Virgin Mary.
De La Cadena Collection at The Hermitage Museum. "...The Hermitage collection was significantly enlarged during the reign of Nicholas I. In 1831 and 1834 a number of paintings by Spanish artists were acquired from the collections of Manuel de Godoy, minister of Spanish King Carlo IV, and of J.M. Paez de la Cadena, the Spanish ambassador in St. Petersburg.These purchases reflected Russia and Europe's interest in Spain at the time and rounded out the Hermitage collection of paintings from the Spanish school." www.arthermitage.org/ . De La Cadena Collection: Allegory of the Christian Church, Alessandro Allori, Early 1600s; Boy Looking for Fleas on a Dog, Pedro Nunez de Villavicencio,1650s; Mary Meeting Elizabeth, Juan del Castillo,1630s; St. John the Baptist in the Desert, Francisco Collantes, between 1629 and 1630; St. Mary of Egypt in the Desert, Jose Claudio Antolinez,1660s; Appearance of St. Francis to the Monks of his Order, Circa 1784; Head of St. Joseph, Mid-17th century; Landscape with Huts, Antonio del Castillo,1650s; Mary Magdalene and Angels, Francisco de Solis, Second half of the 17th century; Portrait of Garsilaso de la Vega, Alonso Cano, 1630s (Suarez de Figueroa Ancestor): Sheep at a Watering Place, Bartolome Esteban Murillo, Second half of the 17th century.
 "Diccionario Historico, Genealogico y Heraldico de las Familias Ilustres de la Monarquis Espanola", p. 256 (Suarez de Figueroa and De La Cadena lineages), D. Luis Vilar Y Pascual, Tomo V, Madrid 1860.
 Edwards, John, "The Spain of the Catholic Monarchs," p. 201.
 "El Libro Verde de Aragon," an ancient document citing Spanish nobility having Jewish roots. Ordered destroyed by the Spanish crown in the 16th century, copies of it survived. It notes that most European nobility has Jewish origins.
 Family Tree Maker's Genealogy Site, 651006. Prince Carlos De Viana, born 29 May 1421 in Penafiel, Valladolid, Spain, died 23 Sept. 1461 in Barcelona, Spain. He was the son of King Juan De Trastamara and Blanche De Navarre (his second wife was Juana Enriquez, Ferdinand the Catholic's mother). Carlos de Viana married Agnes De Cleves, born 24 Feb. 1422 in Kleve, Rheinland, Prussia (Germany). She died 6 April 1448 in Olite Navarra, Spain. Agnes was the daughter of 1302014 Adolph I Herzog Von Kleve and Marie de Bourgogne. Carlos De Viana and Agnes De Cleves had Catalina De La Cadena Mazuelo, born 1448 in Penafiel, Valladolid, Spain. Catalina De La Cadena Mazuelo married Garcia Martinez De Lerma. This data needs further documentation.
  García Puron, Manuel, México y sus Gobernantes. Mexico City: Joaquín Porrua, 1984.
 Gallagher, Patrick, "The Life and Works of Garci Sanchez," London, p. 20 (Suarez de Figueroa documentation).
 Gonzalez Crespo, Esther "Los Arellano y el Sonorio de los Cameros en la Baja Edad Media", (Cadena genealogy) "...Catalina de Mendoza (daughter of Diego Hurtado de Mendoza Figueroa and Brianda de Mendoza y Luna) married Alfonso Ramirez de Arellano, Senorio de los Cameros (chamberlain) first Count of Aguilar ...." p. 5.
 Himmerich y Valencia, Robert "The Encomenderos of New Spain, 1521-1555." University of Texas, 1991.
 Johann Heinrich Zedlers, "Grosses Vollstandiges," p. 1267, published by Universallexion aller Wissenschafften und Kunste." Regarding the De La Cadena family, their forbearers the Suarez de Figueroa-Mendoza family and the Dukes of Feria. In old german script, needs translation.
 Llano, Rodrigo de, "Biblioteca "Rodrigo de Llano" Seccion de Estudios Historicos de la Universidad de Nuevo León. F1386, 5, 'M3, U2, pps. 8–11.
 Llobregat, Conde del, "Los Zaloaga de Fuenterrabia, p. 37, notas biograficas, Madrid, 1918. "...They founded the Capilla de San Pedro de Lerma in Burgos where they're buried along with his brother Sancho Martinez de Lerma, Knight of the Band (Caballero de la Banda--(It's a white sash worn diagonally, across the chest). Guarda Mayor del Rey, (the King's main guard), Senor de Quintanilla y Espinosilla, Mayor of Burgos died 1549.
 Lopez de la Cadena, Alberto Omero, "Our Secret Heritage, Crypto-Jews of South Texas". HaLapid, Summer 2002.
 Marroquin, Jose Maria, Gonzalez Obregon, Luis, "La Ciudad de Mexico", Volume 2, pps. 8–13, published 1900. Cadena genealogy circa 1212 and thereafter. "In the village of Ocana, ... Sancho Sanchez De La Cadena, "Comendador de Socabos...." "...Oidor Andres De La Cadena and Teresa (Suarez) de Figueroa..." (AKA Mendoza) were parents of Maria De La Cadena. Teresa's father was Lorenzo Suarez de Figueroa...." "Ana Maria De La Cadena married Pedro Martinez De Mazuelo, parents in turn of Catalina De La Cadena y Gomez de Mazuelo born in 1450 Burgos, SP. Catalina married Garcia Martinez de Lerma in abt. 1463 in Burgos (Garcia was Ambassador to Rome, June 5, 1475)...Garcia's parents were Sancho Martinez de Lerma and Ana Villela.) [See Conde de Llobregat referenced above]. They in turn had another Catalina De La Cadena y Martinez de (Maria de Irrazaval) Lerma b. Abt. 1464, Seville, Spain. Ref. "Hidalguia" p. 492, by Adolfo Barredo de Valenzuela.... "...Ruy Diaz de Mendoza Velasquez y Cuellar (b. abt. 1525) Granada, Spain, and married Catalina de Salazar de la Cadena (abt. 1545), daughter of Gonzalo Fernandez de Salazar and Catalina De La Cadena Maluenda. The Figueroa family seat was in the "Palacio de Feria" in Zafra, Badajoz, Spain.
 Porras Munoz, Guillermo, "La Calle de Cadena en Mexico," pps. 1—46.
 Valenzuela, Adolfo Barredo, de, Vicente de Cadenas, Instituto Salazar y Castro, "Hidalguia," p. 492 "...Francisco Martinez de Lerma, son of Gonzalez Diez, and grandson of Garcia Martinez de Lerma who died 8 April 1447, his wife Elvira de la Torre died 27 Sept. 1473.
 V. Beltran de Heredia, Vincente Beltran de Heredia ((O.P.)), and V. Beltral de Heredia, "Cartulario de la Universidad de Salamanca," p. 474, [In Spanish] (2.237, 2.238, 2.239) Documentation re the De La Cadena family, descendants of Jewish converso and former Rabbi, Bishop Pablo Santa-Maria, Maria Nunez (Pablo's sister), and Abraham HaLevi, "tax farmer" and money lender (to the king) their ancestor. Madrid, A.H.N., Inquisicion, lib. 575, fol. 33.

External links 
 Spanish Conquest 1492-1580 by Sanderson Beck

Spanish colonial governors and administrators
Encomenderos
Year of birth unknown
1560s deaths
Colonial Mexico
People of New Spain
1525 in New Spain
1526 in New Spain
16th-century Mexican people